AADC  may refer to:
 African-African Descendants Caucus, see Global Afrikan Congress
 Age Appropriate Design Code, a code of practice for online services
 American Anti Drug Council
 Army Air Defence College, academy of the Indian Army
 Army Air Defence Command (Pakistan)
 Aromatic L-amino acid decarboxylase, an enzyme
 Australian Antarctic Data Centre
 Ada Apa dengan Cinta?, a 2002 Indonesian film
Ada Apa dengan Cinta? (short film), a 2014 Indonesian short film
Ada Apa Dengan Cinta? 2, a 2016 Indonesian film
 Azure AD Connect (AADC component), Microsoft Azure